Ouled Selama or Ouled Slama is a town and commune in Blida Province, Algeria. According to the 2008 census it has a population of 27,573.

References

Communes of Blida Province
Cities in Algeria
Algeria